Dimitar Vasev (born 10 September 1965) is a Bulgarian former football player and football manager lastly leading Septemvri Sofia.

Career

Playing career
Born in Sofia, Dimitar Vasev played in his career for Lokomotiv Sofia, Lokomotiv Plovdiv, Chinese Shanghai Shenhua and Chivas El Paso Patriots.

Manager career

Lokomotiv Sofia
After being an assistant manager in his youth club Lokomotiv Sofia, on 31 May 2010 he was appointed as head manager of the team after leaving of Dragan Okuka, but was released from the club on 22 November 2010. 

On 7 April 2014 he was appointed as a manager for a second time taking the charge from Stefan Genov. He was chosen by the Association of Professional Footballers in Bulgaria for best manager of season 2014-15 after qualifying the team on 3rd place in A Group, but the team failed to gain license and later was dissolved.

Septemvri Sofia
On 8 June 2017 Vasev was announced as the new manager of Septemvri Sofia with Hristo Arangelov, the caretaker manager after Nikolay Mitov's tenure, as his first assistant. He was released from the club on 23 August 2017 for bad results, stepping down from the position in favor of Nikolay Mitov.

Managerial statistics

Honours

As a player 
 Lokomotiv Sofia
 Bulgarian Cup
 Winner (1): 1994-95
 A PFG
 Runner-up (1): 1994-95

As a manager 

Best manager for the 2014/2015 A PFG season - chosen by the Association of Professional Footballers in Bulgaria

Personal life
His son Daniel is also a footballer who currently plays for Lokomotiv Sofia.

References

Living people
1965 births
Bulgarian footballers
Bulgaria international footballers
Bulgaria youth international footballers
Bulgarian expatriate footballers
Bulgarian football managers
FC Lokomotiv 1929 Sofia players
PFC Lokomotiv Plovdiv players
Shanghai Shenhua F.C. players
El Paso Patriots players
Expatriate footballers in China
Expatriate soccer players in the United States
First Professional Football League (Bulgaria) players
A-League (1995–2004) players
FC Lokomotiv 1929 Sofia managers
Footballers from Sofia
Association football defenders